Pride of Performance (Urdu: تمغۂ حسنِ کارکردگی) is a civil award given by the Government of Pakistan to Pakistani citizens in recognition of distinguished merit in the fields of literature, arts, sports, medicine, or science.

2000
 Saeed Anwar (sports - cricketer)
 Bhawani Shankar Chowdhry (education)
 Hameed ul Haq (tennis - sports)
 Shareef Kunjahi (Punjabi-language writer)
 Amjad Parvez (Pakistani music critic and singer)

2001
 Ather Shah Khan Jaidi (arts, literature, writer, poet, director, actor)
 Mahar Muhammad Iqbal Marath
 Kamaluddin Ahmed (nuclear physicist)

2002
Awards were given on 23 March 2002.

 Himayat Ali Shair (poet and film songs lyricist)
 Jilani Kamran
 Ali Haider Joshi
 Ghaos Bakhsh Sabir
 Afzaal Ahmed
 Anwar Muzaffar
 Jan Nisar
 Rashid Ahmad
 Shafiqullah
 Aasim Fasih Khan
 Abdul Qadeer Malik
 Abdul Majeed
 Maj Imran Basit
 Ghulam Mustafa
 Mohsin Agha
 Mohammad Naeem 
 Mushtaq Ahmed
 Khalid Aftab
 Deena M. Mistri
 Asghari Maqsood
 Sabz Ali
 Syed Moosa Hasany
 Shoaib Ahmad
 Shagufta Khaliq
 Sabira Begum
 Aisha Mohyuddin
 Asif Satar s/o late Abdus Sattar
 Umar Sardar
 Mohammad Ajmal Khan (sciences, botany) 
 Mohammad Aslam Malik 
 Mohammad Akram
 Mohammad Imran
 Mohammad Farooque
 Akhtar Viqar Azim
 Askari Mian Irani 
 Shoaib Mansoor (film and TV producer/director)
 Shaukat Mahmood (Maxim)
 Farooq Zamir Ghory
 Kanwal Naseer 
 Mohammad Jamil (late TV actor professionally known as Jamil Fakhri) 
Nazia Hasan (arts, singing)

2003
On 14 August 2002, the following list of recipients was announced. It consists of 32 individuals. The award were received by the winners on 23 March 2003.

2004
On 14 August 2003, the following list of recipients was announced. It consists of 37 individuals. The award was received by the winners on 23 March 2004.

2005
On 14 August 2004, the following list of recipients was announced. The awards were received by the winners on 23 March 2005.    

Zafar-uz-Zaman (Chemistry)
Rizwan Hussain (Chemistry)
M. Salahuddin (Science)
Khawaja Moiz-ud-Din (Engineering)
Pervez Ahmed (Engineering)
Rehan Bashir (Mechanical Engineering)
Tariq Jawaid (Mechanical Engineering)
Salim-ud-Din Zahir (Aerospace Engineering)
M. Sadiq Kalim (Education)
Saeed Khan Rangeela (Actor)
Ayub Khoso (TV actor)
Tarannum Naz (Singer)
Khawaja Najmul Hassan (PTV producer)
Tariq Rahman (Literature)
Fahmida Hussain (Literarture)
Sohail Abbas (Hockey player)

2006
On 14 August 2005, the following list of recipients was announced. The award was formally received by the winners on 23 March 2006.

2007
On 14 August 2006, the following list of recipients was announced. The award was received by the winners on 24 March 2007.

2008
On 14 August 2007, the following list of recipients was announced. It consists of 39 individuals. The award was received by the winners on 23 March 2008.

2009
On 14 August 2008, the following list of recipients was announced. It consists of 58 individuals. The award was received by the winners on 23 March 2009.

References

Civil awards and decorations of Pakistan